Željko Kljajević (born 14 September 1984 in Belgrade) is a Serbian-born Montenegrin former football defender.

Club career
After playing in the youth squads of FK Jedinstvo Bijelo Polje and Red Star Belgrade, in his career he already represented several clubs from Serbia, namely FK Rad, FK Zvezdara and FK Obilić, Poland, ŁKS Łódź, Montenegro, FK Mogren, Bosnia and Herzegovina, FK Modriča and Slovenia, NK Maribor.

Honours
Modriča
Premier League of Bosnia and Herzegovina: 2007–08

NK Maribor
Slovenian First League: 2008-09
Slovenian Supercup: 2009

External sources
 
 
 Stats from Slovenia at PrvaLiga.
 

1984 births
Living people
Footballers from Belgrade
Association football central defenders
Serbia and Montenegro footballers
Montenegrin footballers
FK Rad players
FK Zvezdara players
ŁKS Łódź players
FK Obilić players
FK Mogren players
FK Modriča players
NK Maribor players
Aalesunds FK players
First League of Serbia and Montenegro players
Slovenian PrvaLiga players
Serbia and Montenegro expatriate footballers
Expatriate footballers in Poland
Serbia and Montenegro expatriate sportspeople in Poland
Montenegrin expatriate footballers
Expatriate footballers in Bosnia and Herzegovina
Montenegrin expatriate sportspeople in Bosnia and Herzegovina
Expatriate footballers in Slovenia
Montenegrin expatriate sportspeople in Slovenia
Expatriate footballers in Norway
Montenegrin expatriate sportspeople in Norway